Marco Antonio Di Renzo (born 1 August 1969 in Plochingen) is a former Italian cyclist.

Major results

1995
 2nd Gran Premio della Liberazione
 3rd Gran Premio San Giuseppe
 3rd Overall Tour de Slovenie
1996
 1st Stage 3 Settimana Internazionale di Coppi e Bartali
 1st Stage 11 Vuelta a España
 3rd Overall Tour de Slovenie
1st Prologue & Stage 2
 3rd Gran Premio della Costa Etruschi
1998
 1st Tour de Vendée

Grand Tour general classification results timeline

References

1969 births
Living people
Italian male cyclists
Italian Vuelta a España stage winners
Sportspeople from Stuttgart (region)
Cyclists from Abruzzo
People from Esslingen (district)